The Central American mud turtle (Kinosternon angustipons), also known as the narrow-bridged mud turtle, is a species of mud turtle in the Kinosternidae family endemic to Central America. It can be found in the following countries: Costa Rica, Nicaragua and Panama. In terms of reproduction, the female Central American mud Turtle can lay up to 4 eggs at time of reproduction, and multiple times a year.

References

 Tortoise & Freshwater Turtle Specialist Group 1996.  Kinosternon angustipons.   2006 IUCN Red List of Threatened Species.  Downloaded on 5 July 2007.
 Legler, 1965 : A new species of turtle, genus Kinosternon, from Central America. University of Kansas Publications of the Museum of Natural History, volume 15, number 13, pages 617–625.
Legler, J. (1966). Notes on the Natural History of a Rare Central American Turtle, Kinosternon angustipons Legler. Herpetologica,22(2), 118–122. Retrieved from http://www.jstor.org/stable/3890897

Kinosternon
Reptiles of Central America
Turtles of North America
Reptiles described in 1965
Taxonomy articles created by Polbot